Thomas Wheeler (by 1513 – 1574), of Werrington, Staffordshire was an English politician.

He was a Member (MP) of the Parliament of England for Ludlow in 1539, 1545, March 1553 and October 1553.

References

Year of birth unknown
1574 deaths
People from Surrey
Politicians from Shropshire
Year of birth uncertain
English MPs 1539–1540
English MPs 1545–1547
English MPs 1553 (Edward VI)
English MPs 1553 (Mary I)